Nil Montserrat (born 8 December 1988 in Barcelona) is a Spanish racing driver. He has competed in such series as Formula Renault 3.5 Series and the European F3 Open Championship.

References

External links
 Official website
 

1988 births
Living people
Spanish racing drivers
Euroformula Open Championship drivers
Racing drivers from Barcelona
European Le Mans Series drivers
World Series Formula V8 3.5 drivers

De Villota Motorsport drivers
EuroInternational drivers
NACAM F4 Championship drivers
24H Series drivers